The Jerusalem Faction ( HaPeleg HaYerushalmi, or simply Peleg Yerushalmi) is an Israeli-Haredi political organization based in Jerusalem. It was founded in 2012 by Shmuel Auerbach, as a reaction to the Bnei Brak-based Degel HaTorah's perceived moderate approach to the question of conscription of Haredim into the Israel Defence Forces by the Israeli government that came up following the expiration of the Tal Law.
 
The organization is known for its civil disobedience against Haredi conscription that takes the form of street demonstrations that often end in arrests. It has its own newspaper, Hapeles, and political party,  which has won city council seats in Jerusalem, Bnei Brak, and Modi'in Illit. It has been referred to as "hard-line", "extremist", and "radical".

History

Status quo agreement 
The status quo agreement, hammered out in the Knesset (Israeli parliament) informally between David Ben Gurion and the religious parties, granted draft exemptions to yeshiva students who qualified to the status of Torato Umanuto (lit. "His trade is Torah"). For many years the Torato Umanuto arrangement had the status of a regulation under the jurisdiction of the Ministry of Defense (Prime Minister David Ben-Gurion also had the Defense portfolio). In 1998, the High Court of Justice of Israel ruled that the Defense minister had no authority to determine the extent of these exemptions. The Supreme Court postponed the application of the ruling to give the government time to resolve the matter.

Tal Law 
In accordance with the judicial ruling, Prime Minister Ehud Barak set up  the Tal committee in 1999. The committee reported its findings in April 2000, and its recommendations were approved by the Knesset in July 2002; the new "Tal Law", as it came to be known, was passed with 51 votes in favour and 41 against. The new law provided for a continuation of the Torato Umanuto arrangement under specific conditions laid down in the law, such as substituting a one-year civilian service instead of the 3-year military conscription. It was hoped that the number of exemptions would gradually diminish. The new law did not however put an end to controversies and disagreements.

In 2005, then Justice Minister Tzipi Livni stated that the Tal Law, which by then had yet to be fully implemented, did not provide an adequate solution to the issue of Haredi conscription, as only 1,115 of the 41,450 yeshiva students covered by the arrangement had taken the "decision year" provided by the law, and of these only 31 had later enlisted in the Israel Defense Forces. In 2007 the Tal Law was extended until August 2012. In January 2012, Ehud Barak, serving as Defense Minister, said his ministry was preparing an alternative to the Tal Law. Dozens of IDF reserve soldiers had put up what they called "the suckers' camp" near the Tel Aviv Savidor Central Railway Station, to protest the possible extension of the Tal Law. Several politicians, public figures, disabled IDF veterans, and high school and university students visited the protest encampment.

In February 2012, the High Court of Justice (a role of the Supreme Court of Israel) ruled that the Tal Law in its current form was unconstitutional and could not be extended beyond August. Prime Minister Benjamin Netanyahu said that the government would formulate a new bill that would guarantee a more equal sharing of the burden by all parts of Israeli society. The issue was also part of a possible government collapse leading into the 2012-2013 election.

Death of Rabbi Yosef Shalom Elyashiv 
The attitude of the Haredi community towards the outside world had historically been guided by the opinions of its gedolim (lit. "great ones", rabbinical leaders) who through their Da'as Torah were able to create consensus. The death of Rabbi Yosef Shalom Elyashiv in the critical year of 2012 created a power struggle among his successors Rabbi Aharon Leib Shteinman and Rabbi Shmuel Auerbach surrounding the draft controversy, with the former taking a more moderate approach while the latter took a harder stance. In the end Rabbi Shteinman's leadership prevailed, which led to Rabbi Auerbach's founding of the Jerusalem Faction as a protest movement.

Leadership 
Following the death of founder Rabbi Shmuel Auerbach on 24 February 2018, a group of twelve rabbis calling themselves Council of Sages of the Torah World convened in Rabbi Auerbach's former home to plan the future of the Jerusalem Faction. In particular, two disciples of Degel HaTorah political party founder Rabbi Elazar Shach, dayan Rabbi Tzvi Friedman of Bnei Brak and Rabbi Baruch Shmuel Deutsch of Kol Torah yeshiva, appeared to have assumed joint decision making responsibilities for the group. Rabbi Yisrael Yitzchak Kalmanovitz and Rabbi Ezriel Auerbach (brother of Rabbi Shmuel) served as ideological leaders.

Politics 
The Jerusalem Faction runs a political party, under the Hebrew call letters ״עץ״ (lit., Etz). The party claims to be the political heir of Rabbi Elazar Shach, whose Degel HaTorah had in their view been compromised from its original principles. While the Faction also has a focus on threats to the Haredi education system, it mainly concerns itself with fomenting a strong opposition to the draft, which it deems a major threat to young Haredi men and women. The Faction created a Committee for Saving the Torah World to co-ordinate these activities, seeking to prevent any erosion of the status quo.

In 2017, they reportedly represented 6.5% of the Haredi population.

Political candidates 
 is a member of the Jerusalem city council on the Jerusalem Faction ticket. He ran for Mayor of Jerusalem in the 2018 Israeli municipal elections but lost to Moshe Lion.

Newspapers 

The Jerusalem Faction's official organ, Hapeles (The Leveler), was started by former staff of Yated Ne'eman who were terminated for espousing views that were not in keeping with the newspaper's moderate editorial policies. The Faction's views are expressed editorially in the English language in a Brooklyn, New York, periodical called Lehovin (To Understand).

Criticism 
In October 2017, Chaim Kanievsky issued a statement describing the Jerusalem Faction as "empty and reckless", and "like a flock without a shepherd".

See also 
 Protest against conscription of yeshiva students
 Refusal to serve in the IDF

References 

2012 establishments in Israel
Anti-conscription organizations
Anti-Zionist organizations
Haredi Judaism in Israel
Jewish anti-Zionism in Israel
Jewish anti-Zionist organizations
Organizations based in Jerusalem
Haredi anti-Zionism
Orthodox Jewish political parties
Political party factions